The macaques constitute a genus (Macaca) of gregarious Old World monkeys of the subfamily Cercopithecinae. The 23 species of macaques inhabit ranges throughout Asia, North Africa, and (in one instance) Gibraltar. Macaques are principally frugivorous (preferring fruit), although their diet also includes seeds, leaves, flowers, and tree bark. Some species, such as the crab-eating macaque, subsist on a diet of invertebrates and occasionally small vertebrates. On average, southern pig-tailed macaques in Malaysia eat about 70 large rats each per year. All macaque social groups are matriarchal, arranged around dominant females.

Macaques are found in a variety of habitats throughout the Asian continent and are highly adaptable. Certain species have learned to live with humans and have become invasive in some human-settled environments, such as the island of Mauritius and Silver Springs State Park in Florida. Macaques can be a threat to wildlife conservation as well as to human well-being via carrying transmittable and fatal diseases. Currently, invasive species of macaques are handled with several control methods.

Description
Aside from humans (genus Homo), the macaques are the most widespread primate genus, ranging from Japan to the Indian subcontinent, and in the case of the Barbary macaque (Macaca sylvanus), to North Africa and Southern Europe. Twenty-three macaque species are currently recognized.  Macaques are robust primates whose arms and legs are about the same in length.  The fur of these animals is typically varying shades of brown or black and their muzzles are rounded in profile with nostrils on the upper surface.  The tail varies among each species, which can be long, moderate, short or totally absent.  Although several species lack tails, and their common names refer to them as apes, these are true monkeys, with no greater relationship to the true apes than any other Old World monkeys. Instead, this comes from an earlier definition of 'ape' that included primates generally.

In some species, skin folds join the second through fifth toes, almost reaching the first metatarsal joint. The monkey's size differs depending on sex and species.  Males from all species can range from 41 to 70 cm (16 to 28 inches) in head and body length, and in weight from 5.5 to 18 kg (12.13 to 39.7 lb). Females can range from a weight of 2.4 to 13 kg (5.3 to 28.7 lb). These primates live in troops that vary in size, where males dominate, however the rank order of dominance frequently shifts. Female ranking lasts longer and depends upon their genealogical position. Macaques are able to swim and spend most of their time on the ground, along with some time in trees. They have large pouches in their cheeks where they carry extra food. They are considered highly intelligent and are often used in the medical field for experimentation. Adults also are notorious for tending to be bad tempered.

Distribution and habitat
Macaques are highly adaptable to different habitats and climates and can tolerate a wide fluctuation of temperatures and live in varying landscape settings. They easily adapt to human-built environments and can survive well in urban settings if they are able to steal food. They can also survive in completely natural settings absent of humans.

The ecological and geographic ranges of the macaque are the widest of any non-human primate. Their habitats include the tropical rainforests of Southeast Asia, Sri Lanka, India, arid mountains of Pakistan and Afghanistan, and temperate mountains in Algeria, Japan, northern China, Morocco, and Nepal. Some species also inhabit villages and towns in cities in Asia.

Ecology and behavior

Diet
Macaques are mainly vegetarian, although some species have been observed feeding on insects. In natural habitats, they have been observed to consume certain parts of over one hundred species of plants including the buds, fruit, young leaves, bark, roots, and flowers. When macaques live amongst people, they raid agricultural crops such as wheat, rice, or sugarcane; and garden crops like tomatoes, bananas, melons, mangos, or papayas. In human settings, they also rely heavily on direct handouts from people. This includes peanuts, rice, legumes, or even prepared food.

Group structure
Macaques live in established social groups that can range from a few individuals to several hundred, as they are social animals. A typical social group possess between 20 and 50 individuals of all ages and of both sexes. The typical composition consists of 15% adult males, 35% adult females, 20% infants, and 30% juveniles, though there exists variation in structure and size of groups across populations.

Macaques have a very intricate social structure and hierarchy. If a macaque of a lower level in the social chain has eaten berries and none are left for a higher-ranking macaque, then the one higher in status can, within this social organization, remove the berries from the other monkey's mouth.

Reproduction and mortality
The reproductive potential of each species differs. Populations of the rhesus macaque can grow at rates of 10% to 15% per year if the environmental conditions are favorable.  However, some forest-dwelling species are endangered with much lower reproductive rates. After one year of age, macaques move from being dependent on their mother during infancy, to the juvenile stage, where they begin to associate more with other juveniles through rough tumble and playing activities. They sexually mature between three and five years of age. Females will usually stay with the social group in which they were born; however, young adult males tend to disperse and attempt to enter other social groups. Not all males succeed in joining other groups and may become solitary, attempting to join other social groups for many years. Macaques have a typical lifespan of 20 to 30 years.

As invasive species

Certain species under the genus Macaca have become invasive in certain parts of the world, while others that survive in forest habitats remain threatened. The long-tailed macaque (M. fascicularis) is listed as a threat and invasive alien species in Mauritius, along with the rhesus macaques (M. mulatta) in Florida.

The long-tailed macaque causes severe damage to parts of its range where it has been introduced because the populations grow unchecked due to a lack of predators. On the island Mauritius, they have created serious conservation concerns for other endemic species. They consume seeds of native plants and aid in the spread of exotic weeds throughout the forests. This changes the composition of the habitats and allows them to be rapidly overrun by invasive plants.

Long-tailed macaques are also responsible for the near extinction of several bird species on Mauritius by destroying the nests of the birds as they move through their native ranges and eat the eggs of critically endangered species, such as the pink pigeon and Mauritian green parrot. They can be serious agricultural pests because they raid crops and gardens and humans often shoot the monkeys which can eliminate entire local populations.

In Florida, a group of rhesus macaques inhabit Silver Springs State Park. Humans often feed them, which may alter their movement and keep them close to the river on weekends where high human traffic is present. The monkeys can become aggressive toward humans, and also carry potentially fatal human diseases, including the herpes B virus.

Relations with humans
Several species of macaque are used extensively in animal testing, particularly in the neuroscience of visual perception and the visual system.

Nearly all (73–100%) pet and captive rhesus macaques are carriers of the herpes B virus. This virus is harmless to macaques, but infections of humans, while rare, are potentially fatal, a risk that makes macaques unsuitable as pets.

Urban performing macaques also carried simian foamy virus, suggesting they could be involved in the species-to-species jump of similar retroviruses to humans.

Population control
Management techniques have historically been controversial, and public disapproval can hinder control efforts. Previously, efforts to remove macaque individuals were met with public resistance. One management strategy that is currently being explored is that of sterilization. Natural resource managers are being educated by scientific studies in the proposed strategy. Effectiveness of this strategy is estimated to succeed in keeping populations in check. For example, if 80% of females are sterilized every five years, or 50% every two years, it could effectively reduce the population. Other control strategies include planting specific trees to provide protection to native birds from macaque predation, live trapping, and the vaccine porcine zona pellucida (PZP), which causes infertility in females.

Cloning

In January 2018, scientists in China reported in the journal Cell the first creation of two crab-eating macaque clones, named Zhong Zhong and Hua Hua, using somatic cell nuclear transfer – the same method that produced Dolly the sheep.

Species
As of 2005, the authors of Mammal Species of the World recognized the following species and species groups, aside from the white-cheeked macaque, which was described in 2015.

Later studies disputed some of these species groupings.  For example, Li et al., based on DNA testing, do not recognize the M. fascularis group.  Rather, they place the crab-eating macaque within the M. mulatta group and the stump-tailed macaque within the M. sinica group.
  
Prehistoric (fossil) species:
 M. anderssoni Schlosser, 1924
 M. jiangchuanensis Pan et al., 1992
 M. libyca Stromer, 1920
 M. majori Schaub & Azzaroli in Comaschi Caria, 1969 (sometimes included in M. sylvanus)
 M. florentina Cocchi, 1872

In Popular Culture
In the television show Leave it to Beaver (S3:E29), the plot features a pet Macaque named Stanley in a prominent role.

Gallery

See also
 Baboon
 Herpes B virus
 Kayabukiya Tavern
 Macaque brain development timeline

References

External links

 Macaque Monkey Brain Atlas
 Primate Info Net Macaca Factsheets

.01
Primates of Africa
Primates of Asia
Tool-using mammals